Laxoplumeria  is a genus of plants in the family Apocynaceae, first described as a genus in 1947. They are native to Panama and South America.

Species
 Laxoplumeria baehniana Monach. - French Guiana; Acre + Amazonas States in Brazil
 Laxoplumeria macrophylla (Kuhlm.) Monach. - Minas Gerais 
 Laxoplumeria tessmannii Markgr. - Panama, Colombia, Ecuador, Peru, Bolivia

References

Apocynaceae genera
Rauvolfioideae